Sofia Vladimirovna Samodelkina (born 18 February 2007) is a Russian figure skater. She is 2021 JGP Slovenia silver medalist, 2021 JGP Russia bronze medalist, and 2021 Denis Ten Memorial Challenge champion.

Samodelkina is the ninth woman to land a quadruple jump and the fifteenth to land a triple Axel jump in international competition. She is the second woman after Alexandra Trusova who has landed quadruple jumps except quad Axel in practice. She is the first woman to attempt a quad loop in competition, but the jump was not ratified due to under-rotation. She has landed ratified triple axels, quad salchows, and quad toes in international competition.

Personal life 

Samodelkina was born in Moscow on 18 February 2007. She is a junior high school student, and her hobbies include drawing.

Career

Early years 
Samodelkina placed fourth at the 2020 Russian Junior Championships and 2021 Russian Junior Championships. She was second at the 2021 Russian Cup Final and first at the 2020 Russian Cup Final on the junior level.

2021–22 season: International junior debut 
Samodelkina made her junior international debut at the 2021 JGP Russia held in Krasnoyarsk in mid-September. She fell on an underrotated triple Axel jump in the short program, missing her combination as a result, ending up sixth in that segment. In the free skate, she placed second behind Sofia Akateva, landing a quadruple Salchow with positive GOE and becoming the ninth woman in history to land a quad. She also landed a quad Salchow-double toe loop combination and quad Lutz in the program, although called a quarter short, taking the bronze medal overall. At the 2021 JGP Slovenia, she made a mistake on the opening triple Axel and placed fourth. She won the free skate after landing a quad Salchow and rose to second place overall.
 
Later in autumn, at the 2021 Denis Ten Memorial Challenge, Samodelkina became the fifteenth woman to land a triple Axel jump in international competition and won the event.

Samodelkina made her debut at the senior national championships at the 2022 Russian Championships, where she placed fifth. She underrotated two of her three quad attempts but expressed enthusiasm at the overall results and qualifying for the national team for the following season.

At the 2022 Russian Junior Championships, Samodelkina performed her short program cleanly, including the triple Axel-triple toe loop combination, and placed second behind Sofia Akatieva. She stumbled on the quad Lutz and quad Salchow in the free skate but completed the other elements cleanly and won the silver medal behind Akatieva.

Programs

Competitive highlights 

JGP: Junior Grand Prix

Detailed results 
Small medals for short and free programs awarded only at ISU Championships. 

Personal ICU bests highlighted in bold. Personal bests highlighted in italic.

Senior results

Junior-level

References

External links 
 

2007 births
Living people
Russian female single skaters
Figure skaters from Moscow